The second election to the State Council of Ceylon was held from 22 February to 7 March 1936.

Background
The first State Council was dissolved on 7 December 1935 and candidate nominations took place on 15 January 1936. Seven constituencies only had a single nomination each and consequently the candidates were elected without a vote. Elections in the remaining 41 constituencies took place between 22 February and 7 March 1936.

Elected members

References

Parliamentary elections in Sri Lanka
1936 elections in Asia
1936 in Ceylon
Election, 1936
February 1936 events
March 1936 events
1936 elections in the British Empire